Hobbs Quarry, Longhope is a  geological and biological Site of Special Scientific Interest in Gloucestershire, England, notified in 1966.  It is situated midway between Longhope and Dursley Cross in the Forest of Dean. Adjacent woods are Kiln Wood and Coleman's Wood. The site is managed by the Gloucestershire Wildlife Trust.

The site is listed in the 'Forest of Dean Local Plan Review' as a Key Wildlife Site (KWS).

The quarry is known for its geological exposures, and was originally about a mile long extending into Kiln Wood, which is to the north of this reserve. The southernmost part of the quarry was used as a public landfill site and destroyed and the northernmost part became under threat from fly-tipping. The Nature Conservancy Council designated the site an SSSI and undertook rehabilitation work.  The Gloucestershire Wildlife Trust purchased the site in 1981.  The Forest of Dean District Council provided grant aid.

History
The quarry was worked from the seventeenth century to the end of the nineteenth century at least.  It is depicted on the OS map of 1889.  It produced burning-lime and there is an old kiln standing at the southern end of the reserve.  Classic exposures of Silurian Wenlock limestone were left once quarrying ceased. The series of algal and coral reefs have major visual impact and are called 'ballstones' because they have a circular cross-section.  Drapes of bedded limestone overlay the reefs and were formed about 400 million years ago when the region was under warm seas.  The rocks contain a diversity of fossils, referred to in scientific publications from the mid-nineteenth century. The fossils include corals, brachipods, trilobites and crinoids. This is an important educational location for geology students.

Lime was used for improve Dean soils which are acid, and for making mortar.  When limestone was burned using a kiln, dangerous quicklime is produced.  This slaked with water makes hydrated lime which can be transported safely.

Trees and plants
When the site was no longer a working quarry its floor and walls were soon colonised by a mass of the more common species such as ash, bramble and wild clematis (known as old man's beard). The damp walls support moss and hart's-tongue fern.

The presence of small-leaved lime indicates that the quarry was once part of the adjoining Coleman's Wood which is ancient woodland. Traditionally the limes were coppiced. There is pedunculate oak, silver birch and field maple, and shrubs such as hazel, goat willow, dogwood and hawthorn.

The upper edges of the reserve were not quarried and the area supports ancient woodland flowers such as wood anemone, wood sorrel, primrose, sweet woodruff, greater butterfly-orchid, herb paris and bluebell.

Birds, mammals and invertebrates
Reported bird sightings include blackcap, treecreeper, nuthatch, and long-tailed tit. Buzzards and ravens are seen and heard. The common dormouse may be found. The sheltered site is ideal for butterflies.

Conservation
The area supporting the most impressive exposures and the floor are maintained free of scrub.  The banks are managed to provide good views from pathways and to encourage the spring flowers.

Publications

 Kelham, A, Sanderson, J, Doe, J, Edgeley-Smith, M, et al., 1979, 1990, 2002 editions, 'Nature Reserves of the Gloucestershire Trust for Nature Conservation/Gloucestershire Wildlife Trust'
 'Hobbs Quarry Nature Reserve – Beautiful woodland walk among Silurian coral reefs', (undated), Gloucestershire Wildlife Trust
 'Where to see Wildlife in the Forest of Dean', January 2012, Gloucestershire Wildlife Trust

References

SSSI source
 Natural England SSSI information on the citation
 Natural England SSSI information on the unit

External links
 Gloucestershire Wildlife Trust
 Natural England (SSSI information)

Sites of Special Scientific Interest in Gloucestershire
Sites of Special Scientific Interest notified in 1966
Nature reserves in Gloucestershire
Forest of Dean
Quarries in Gloucestershire
Lime kilns in England